The 2013–14 Welsh Premier League was the fifth season of the Women's Welsh Premier League, the top level women's football league in Wales.

Cardiff City were the defending champions having won their first championship last season.
The season was won by Cardiff Met. Ladies.

During the winter break Northop Hall Girls withdrew from the league. All results including them were then wiped from the table.

Changes from 2012–13
PILCS LFC replaced Caerphilly Castle who got relegated last season.
Two instead of one team are relegated after the season.

Clubs

Standings

Results grid

League Cup
For the first time a League Cup was played. The new competition was introduced to further develop women's football. In the first round four teams (Port Talbot Town, Aberystwyth Town, Llanidloes Town and Newcastle Emlyn) were drawn to receive a bye to the second round. The final was played on 30 March 2014 on neutral ground at Port Talbot. Cardiff Met. won the title.

References

External links
welshpremier.com
welsh-premier.com
League at uefa.com

2013-14
Wales Women
2013–14 in Welsh football leagues
1